R-Evolution may refer to:

 R-Evolution (film), a 2013 music documentary about the Doors
 R-Evolution (Cochrane), a 2015 sculpture by Marco Cochrane
 NXT TakeOver: R Evolution, a 2014 professional wrestling event